Helmstorf is the name of several northern German towns and villages and may refer to:
 Helmstorf, Schleswig-Holstein
 Helmstorf, Mecklenburg-Vorpommern
 Helmstorf, Niedersachsen, now a part of the Seevetal municipality.